is a railway station on the Odakyū Odawara Line and Tokyo Metro Chiyoda Line in Shibuya, Tokyo, Japan. The Tokyo Metro station number is C-01. 

Both lines share platforms at this station, as each line has through operation onto the other.

Station layout

Services
Except for Romancecar limited express services, all Odakyu Odawara Line trains stop at Yoyogi-Uehara.

Surrounding area
Tokyo Metropolitan Route 413 ("Inokashira-dōri") intersects the Odawara Line just west of the station. There are several music-related institutions including Koga Masao Museum of Music and JASRAC headquarters located nearby as well as the Tokyo Camii mosque.

A nearby bus stop served by Keio Dentetsu Bus provides local transit in the immediate vicinity.

History 
The station was opened as a stop on the Odakyu Odawara Line on 1 April 1927.

TRTA (now Tokyo Metro) began service at the station on 31 March 1978. 

Station numbering was introduced to the Odakyu Line in 2014 with Yoyogi-Uehara being assigned station number OH05.

References

Railway stations in Japan opened in 1927
Odakyu Odawara Line
Stations of Odakyu Electric Railway
Tokyo Metro Chiyoda Line
Stations of Tokyo Metro
Railway stations in Tokyo